Good Neighbours (onscreen title, though some movie posters use spelling Good Neighbors) is a 2010 Canadian thriller film written and directed by Jacob Tierney. It is based on the book by Chrystine Brouillet.

Plot
Louise works as a waitress in a Chinese restaurant in the Notre-Dame-de-Grâce neighbourhood of Montreal where she lives.  She has become obsessed with the story of a recent spate of serial murders committed in the area, and scours newspapers for stories about each victim. When the latest victim is a co-worker who last spoke of a blond, muscular man she met at the bar, and with whom she had a drink date after she got off work at midnight, she becomes much more fearful. Louise's wheelchair-using neighbour, Spencer, shared her interest to a point but values his privacy and solitude. Victor is an awkward and talkative elementary school teacher who recently moved into their apartment building, and ingratiated himself into their lives.  Louise, who much prefers the company of her cats, Tia Maria and Mozart, to humans. She warms to Victor who walks her home after work after her co-worker was murdered and she was questioned by an officer who fit her co-worker's description of who was supposed to get drinks with after work the night she was murdered.

Spencer dispassionately reveals to Victor that he was paralyzed in a car accident that killed his wife, and rejects Victor's sympathy. He later reacts angrily when Victor installs a wheelchair-accessible ramp in the building.

Victor, who has developed a crush on Louise, invents an imaginary love life with her and tells his brother at a party that they have become engaged. At the party, Victor surprises Louise with the arrival of his cat from China that his brother brought after its customs quarantine. Louise is instantly enamored with Balthazar. During the cover of night, Spencer sneaks out his window and climbs the fire escape, secretly enjoying the city's nightlife. Later as Spencer returns home via the fire escape, one of Victor's friends spots him. In the morning Victor dismisses the possibility that it could be Spencer. Louise comes by to see Victor's cat.

On Christmas morning, their abusive Francophone neighbour, Valérie, poisons Louise's cats. Louise spends more time at Victor's apartment, preferring to be alone with his cat and even taking the cat to her home.

Louise uses sensationalist media reports to plan the murder of Valérie.  After seducing Victor, she saves his sperm. After cleaning herself up, she visits Spencer for a drink and hits on him.

Louise leaves work early claiming to be sick and tired home to begin her revenge plan. Having kept Victor's sperm from their sexual encounter, Louise uses it to give the impression that Valérie has been raped as well as murdered.

After violating Valérie's corpse to plant Victor's semen and fit the serial killer's profile, Louise returns home and she runs into Spencer, who has decided to go out. With both caught in compromising positions, Louise asks for his help reaching the fire escape. She hands him her bag of evidence to which he looks surprised but he helps her nonetheless. After she asks, he gives her back her murder kit.  Curious about the noise, Victor looks out his window and sees Spencer, and begins to suspect he is the serial killer. 

While the same officers are questioning Louise once again, Spencer calls and invites her over for a drink and warns her not to say anything unnecessary.

That evening, Victor intercepts Louise before she goes to Spencer's for a drink. He explains what he spoke to the police about and that he saw Spencer running outside the night Valèrie was murdered and proposes trapping Spencer as he knows he will come for Victor next.

Later, Spencer outright suggests that he and Louise frame Victor for the murders, unaware that Louise has already spoken to Victor and that he wants to trap Spencer. Victor's plan involves Louise acknowledging their "engagement" after Victor mistakenly says too much to the investigating police officers.

Spencer plans a dinner party as part of the set up of Victor. As Louise leaves Victor's window open per Spencer's plan she notices the car of the investigating officers sitting across from the apartment building. Victor seems ready for what is to come as Louise says good night to him. Spencer breaks into Victor's apartment, the police who were tipped off by Victor, rush to his help, as Victor confronts
Spencer and then follows him out the fire escape to prevent him from going to Louise's apartment. Spencer is about to tell Victor who really killed Valèrie but Victor kicks him and he falls off the fire escape. Louise is quite disinterested and ignores the entire conflict as she feeds Victor's cat, though once she smiled upon hearing Spencer's rage upon discovering her betrayal.

As Victor looks down at Spencer bleeding out in the snow, he seems to be in shock as the investigating officer tells Victor to call 911 while he goes down there. The officer tells Victor he did the right thing. Louise let's the cat out the window who enters Spencer's apartment and climbs on top his fish tank.

Cast

 Jay Baruchel as Victor
 Scott Speedman as Spencer
 Emily Hampshire as Louise
 Anne-Marie Cadieux as Valérie
 Diane D'Aquila as Miss Van Ilen
 Xavier Dolan as Jean-Marc
 Gary Farmer as Brandt 
 Clara Furey as Nathalie
 Nathalie Girard as Nightclub Waitress
 Kaniehtiio Horn as Johanne 
 Pat Kiely as Bilodeau
 Micheline Lanctôt as Mme Gauthier
 Sean Lu as Mr. Chou
 Jacob Tierney as Jonah
 Kevin Tierney as Jérôme Langlois

Production
Tierney filmed it under the working title Notre Dame de Grâce in and around Montreal, Quebec, Canada.

Release
The film had its world premiere as part of the 2010 Toronto International Film Festival on 15 September 2010. Magnolia Pictures released it for the Whistler Film Festival.

Reception
Rotten Tomatoes, a review aggregator, reports that 67% of 30 surveyed critics gave the film a positive review; the average rating is 5.9/10. Metacritic gave it a weighted average rating of 60/100 based on 12 reviews, indicating "mixed or average reviews".

Jim Slotek of the Toronto Sun rated it 3.5/5 stars and wrote, "A film short on conventional action, Good Neighbours nonetheless conveys a sense of imminent danger and tightly wound passions". Stephen Cole of The Globe and Mail rated it 3/4 stars and called it "a wickedly funny noir" which satirises the 1995 Quebec referendum. John Anderson of Variety wrote that it "never finds a comfortable groove, or a tone that would enable its convoluted yet predictable plotting to engage the viewer." Kirk Honeycutt of The Hollywood Reporter called it "a kind of deconstruction of noir atmosphere and its tropes into a meditation on the treachery of the human heart." Jeannete Catsoulis of The New York Times wrote, "We are never in any doubt as to the identity of the serial killer who haunts the news and the neighborhood’s shadowy corners, but suspense is not the point — alienation is." Alison Willmore of The A.V. Club rated it B− and described it as "something of a rejection of urban communal sentiment, a cautionary tale against getting to know the locals."  Paul Schrodt of Slant Magazine rated it 1.5/4 stars and wrote, "Tierney's is the kind of post-post horror-thriller that puts all of its killings in clear air quotes, making you cringe at the same time you admire its assumed cleverness."

References

External links
 
 
 

2010 films
2010 thriller drama films
2010s serial killer films
Canadian serial killer films
Canadian thriller drama films
English-language Canadian films
Films directed by Jacob Tierney
Films set in 1995
Films set in 1996
Films set in Montreal
Films shot in Montreal
2010s Canadian films